In the Name of the Girl is a 2011 Ecuadorian drama film written and directed by Tania Hermida.

The film is a religious and social criticism of Ecuadorian Christianity and capitalism from the point of view of Manuela, a girl who was raised with revolutionary ideas, without religious ties and with a deep sense of social equality.

Plot
A nine-year-old girl's name is in dispute. Manuela is named after her father, a socialist and atheist; but her grandmother, Catholic and conservative, insists on giving her the name that all the first-born of the family have carried for generations: Dolores. The story takes place in a valley in the Ecuadorian Andes, in the summer of 1976. Manuela and her younger brother, Camilo, remain in the care of their grandparents at the family's farm house, where they share the holidays with the cousins. Manuela is a girl who was raised with revolutionary ideas, without religious ties and with a deep sense of social equality. There Manuela is frustrated and lost before the great ideological differences, which make her collide with her grandparents, uncles and cousins.

It will be his meeting with the crazy uncle, hidden in the library of the hacienda house (where he has dedicated himself to freeing words), that awakens his need to go through mirrors, forever transforming his relationship with language and names.

Cast
 Eva Mayu Mecham Benavides as Manuela
 Markus Mecham Benavides as Camilo
 Martina León as María Paz
 Sebastián Hormachea as Andrés
 Francisco Jaramillo as Emilio
 Paul Curillo as Pepe
 Dianneris Díaz as Juanita
 Pancho Aguirre as Uncle Felipe
 Juana Estrella as Grandma Lola
 Felipe Vega de la Cuadra as Grandpa Emilio

References

External links
 

2011 films
Ecuadorian drama films
2010s Spanish-language films
2011 drama films
Films critical of the Catholic Church
Films critical of religion
Films with atheism-related themes